Antti Amatus Aarne (December 5, 1867 in Pori – February 2, 1925 in Helsinki) was a Finnish folklorist.

Background
Aarne was a student of Kaarle Krohn, the son of the folklorist Julius Krohn. 
He further developed their historic-geographic method of comparative folkloristics, and developed the initial version of what became the Aarne–Thompson classification system of classifying folktales, first published in 1910 and extended by Stith Thompson first in 1927 and again in 1961.

Early in 1925, Aarne died in Helsinki (Finland) where he had been a lecturer at the University since 1911 and where he had held a position as Professor extraordinarius since 1922.

References

External links

Academic staff of the University of Helsinki
Finnish folklorists
1867 births
1925 deaths
Folklorists
People from Pori